Gospođince is a village located in the municipality of Preševo, Serbia. According to the 2002 census, the village has a population of 41 (100,0 %) people, all Albanians.

References

Populated places in Pčinja District
Albanian communities in Serbia